Al-Meshkhab is a district located in Najaf Governorate. Its seat is the city of Al-Meshkhab. Soil of Al-Meshkhab is fertile, alluvial, and a good irrigated by Meshkhab Channel (derived from Euphrates River). Agricultural is main source of income in Al-Meshkhab  crops such as rice, Date palm, and wheat planted there densely.
total inhabitants are Arab Shia Islam.

References

Cities in Iraq
Populated places along the Silk Road
Populated places on the Euphrates River
Populated places in Al-Qādisiyyah Governorate